Drosophila californica is a species of fruit fly. It has been found in Yosemite National Park in California.

References 

californica
Insects described in 1923
Diptera of North America